The 2019–20 Arkansas Razorbacks men's basketball team represented the University of Arkansas during the 2019–20 season. The team was led by first-year head coach Eric Musselman, and played their home games at Bud Walton Arena in Fayetteville, Arkansas as a member of the Southeastern Conference. The Razorbacks finished with a record of 20–12 (7–11), with junior Mason Jones earning a share of the SEC Player of the Year award and being named a consensus First-Team All-SEC player.

Arkansas started the season strongly, going into conference play with an 11–1 record, including two road wins against Power Five teams, Georgia Tech and Indiana. The first quarter of conference play was promising for the Razorbacks, with the only setback coming on the road against LSU, 79–77. Heading into a highly anticipated home game with #10 Kentucky, the Hogs were 14–2, with a 3–1 conference record. Arkansas led with less than nine minutes left in the game when Kentucky head coach John Calipari was ejected, sparking a Kentucky run and victory. From there the season bottomed out, with the Hogs finishing the last fourteen games of the conference season with a record of 4–10 for a final regular season record of 19–12 (7–11), including a five-game losing streak without star guard Isaiah Joe that featured back-to-back overtime losses for the first time in school history, in addition to a one-point loss. Heading into the last quarter of the conference season, Arkansas avenged earlier losses to Missouri and Tennessee, placing the Hogs back on the bubble, but fell on the road to thirteenth-place Georgia, effectively knocking the Razorbacks out of tournament contention. After splitting the last two games of the season at home against LSU and on the road against Texas A&M, the Hogs were on the outside looking in, most likely needing to win the SEC tournament to receive an NCAA tournament bid. 
 		 
After winning their first-round game against Vanderbilt on March 11, 2020, the Hogs were slated for a rematch against South Carolina in the second round, but the SEC announced on March 12, 2020 that the SEC Tournament was cancelled due to the COVID-19 pandemic, with an announcement following from the NCAA later that day that the whole tournament was cancelled, along with all other winter and spring championships, ending the Razorbacks' season.
 
The Razorbacks received some votes for the AP Poll throughout the non-conference season, but never earned a ranking, and stopped receiving votes by the end of January. 
 	
Mason Jones was voted the SEC Player of the Year by the league media, sharing the honor with Reggie Perry, a Mississippi State player and former Arkansas commit, while the coaches' award went to Immanuel Quickley, of Kentucky. Jones was the third Razorback to win the award, along with Bobby Portis and Corliss Williamson. Jones had an outstanding season, being named SEC Player of the Week four times, one of three SEC players to ever do so and the first in over a decade. Jones led the SEC in scoring, becoming the first Razorback to claim the SEC scoring title, while also finishing ranked eighth in the country for points per game. Jones led the NCAA in both free throw attempts and makes, while also having nine thirty-point games, the most by an SEC player in two decades. Jones broke Sidney Moncrief's school record for free throws made in a season, in addition to being one of only three players in the previous thirty years to score forty points in a game multiple times in a season. Jones was named a consensus First-Team All-SEC player, the tenth time an Arkansas player has achieved that honor. Jones was also named an Honorable Mention All-American by the Associated Press (AP).

Previous season

On March 26, 2019, Arkansas athletic director Hunter Yurachek fired former head coach Mike Anderson. Following a 12-day search, Yurachek announced Musselman's hiring on April 7.

Former guard Keyshawn Embery-Simpson had already announced following Anderson's firing that he would be leaving the school and transferring to Tulsa.

Offseason

Departures

Incoming Transfers

Jamario Bell would also join the team with one year of eligibility after his career with the Arkansas football team ended.

2019 recruiting class

2020 Recruiting class

Preseason

SEC media poll
The SEC media poll was released on October 15, 2019.

Preseason All-SEC teams
The Razorbacks had one player selected to the preseason all-SEC teams.

Second Team

Isaiah Joe

Roster

Schedule and results

|-
!colspan=12 style=|Exhibition

|-
!colspan=12 style=|Regular season

|-
!colspan=12 style=| SEC Tournament

See also
2019–20 Arkansas Razorbacks women's basketball team

References

Arkansas Razorbacks
Arkansas Razorbacks men's basketball seasons
Arkansas Razorbacks men's basketball
Arkansas Razorbacks men's basketball